Roses Are Red is a traditional poem.

Roses Are Red may also refer to:

In music:
 Roses Are Red (album), a 1962 album by Bobby Vinton
 "Roses Are Red (My Love)", the title song
 Roses Are Red (compilation), a later 1995 greatest-hits album by Vinton
 "Roses Are Red" (The Mac Band song), 1988
 "Roses Are Red" (Aqua song), 1996
 Roses Are Red (band), a 2002 American alternative rock band

In other media:
 Roses Are Red (film), a 1947 film starring Patricia Knight
 Roses Are Red (novel), a 2000 novel by James Patterson

See also 
 Roses Are Red, Violets Are Blue (album), a 2004 album by Trocadero
 Violets Are Blue (disambiguation)